Interleukin 5 (IL5) is an interleukin produced by type-2 T helper cells and mast cells.

Function 
Through binding to the interleukin-5 receptor, interleukin 5 stimulates B cell growth and increases immunoglobulin secretion - primarily IgA. It is also a key mediator in eosinophil activation.

Structure 
IL-5 is a 115-amino acid (in human, 133 in the mouse) -long TH2 cytokine that is part of the hematopoietic family.  Unlike other members of this cytokine family (namely interleukin 3 and GM-CSF), this glycoprotein in its active form is a homodimer.

Tissue expression 
The IL-5 gene is located on chromosome 11 in the mouse, and chromosome 5 in humans, in close proximity to the genes encoding IL-3, IL-4, and granulocyte-macrophage colony-stimulating factor (GM-CSF), which are often co-expressed in TH2 cells.  Interleukin-5 is also expressed by eosinophils and has been observed in the mast cells of asthmatic airways by immunohistochemistry. IL-5 expression is regulated by several transcription factors including GATA3.

Clinical significance 
Interleukin-5 has long been associated with the cause of several allergic diseases including allergic rhinitis and asthma, wherein a large increase in the number of circulating, airway tissue, and induced sputum eosinophils have been observed.  Given the high concordance of eosinophils and, in particular, allergic asthma pathology, it has been widely speculated that eosinophils have an important role in the pathology of this disease.

Drugs that target IL-5 are mepolizumab and reslizumab.

Effect on eosinophils 
Eosinophils are terminally differentiated granulocytes found in most mammals. The principal role of these cells, in a healthy host, is the elimination of antibody bound parasites through the release of cytotoxic granule proteins.  Given that eosinophils are the primary IL-5Rα-expressing cells, it is not surprising that this cell type responds to IL-5.  In fact, IL-5 was originally discovered as an eosinophil colony-stimulating factor, is a major regulator of eosinophil accumulation in tissues, and can modulate eosinophil behavior at every stage from maturation to survival. Mepolizumab is a monoclonal antibody antagonist  IL-5 which can reduce excessive eosinophilia.

In Hodgkin lymphoma, for instance, the typically-observed eosinophilia is thought to be attributable to an increased production of IL-5.

Interactions 
Interleukin 5 has been shown to interact with Interleukin 5 receptor alpha subunit.

Receptors 
The IL-5 receptor is composed of an α and a βc chain. The α subunit is specific for the IL-5 molecule, whereas the βc subunit also recognised by interleukin 3 (IL3) and granulocyte-macrophage colony-stimulating factor (GM-CSF). Glycosylation of the Asn196 residue of the Rα subunit appears to be essential for binding of IL-5.

References

External links 
 

Interleukins